Andy Rathbone is the author of a number of For Dummies books about Microsoft Windows as well as other computing books.

Biography
Rathbone was born in San Diego, California. He attended San Diego State University, majoring in comparative literature, and graduated in 1986. He lives with his wife Tina in Ocean Beach, a neighborhood in San Diego, California.

The character of shy teenager Mark "The Rat" Ratner, who has a crush on Jennifer Jason Leigh's character in the movie Fast Times at Ridgemont High, was modeled on Rathbone after writer Cameron Crowe befriended him during Crowe's research for the original book at San Diego's Clairemont High School. Rathbone's portrayal in the film was featured in an article titled "Geek God" published in the March 13, 1995, issue of People Weekly magazine.

Career
Before becoming an author, Rathbone was a reporter for the La Jolla Light newspaper, was an editor at ComputorEdge Magazine, and has freelanced for PC World, ComputerWorld and CompuServe.

In 1992, he wrote his first For Dummies book, Windows For Dummies, which was a New York Times bestseller. Since then, he has published some 50 computer books. His latest book is Windows 11 For Dummies (2021). Several of his For Dummies books have made USA Today's bestseller list.

References

External links
Andy Rathbone's official site
Datamation, review of Windows 7, May 18, 2009

American technology writers
Living people
Writers from San Diego
People in information technology
San Diego State University alumni
20th-century American non-fiction writers
21st-century American non-fiction writers
Year of birth missing (living people)